Tiglmamine or Tiguelmamine, diminutives of the Berber word "Auelmame" which means lake, is situated  from Khénifra in the heart of the Moyen Atlas, in Morocco, at 1,630m altitude. The site is classed as a national heritage monument.

References

External links 
Zones humides Moyen Atlas
Lac Afennourir
Images des lacs du Moyen Atlas

Lakes of Morocco